Sveti Florijan nad Škofjo Loko (in older sources also Sveti Florjan) is a small settlement in the Municipality  of Škofja Loka in the Upper Carniola region of Slovenia. The church of Saint Florian on a hill above the village, though actually belonging to the neighbouring village of Sopotnica, gave its name to the settlement.

Name
The name of the settlement was changed from Sveti Florjan (literally, 'Saint Florian') to Florjan na Zmincem (literally, 'Florian above Zminec') in 1955. The name was changed on the basis of the 1948 Law on Names of Settlements and Designations of Squares, Streets, and Buildings as part of efforts by Slovenia's postwar communist government to remove religious elements from toponyms. The name was changed again in 2002 to Sveti Florijan nad Škofjo Loko. In the past the German name was Sankt Florian.

References

External links
Sveti Florijan nad Škofjo Loko at Geopedia

Populated places in the Municipality of Škofja Loka